Finta is a Brazilian sports equipment manufacturing company based in Sao Paulo. The company produces football equipment, including boots, balls, goalkeeper gloves, and accessories (shin guards, bags)

In recent years, Finta also manufactured equipment for volleyball and basketball, including clothing.

History 
The Finta is a genuinely Brazilian sports brand that since its founding in 1987 has provided uniforms and sports equipment to large clubs. In this short period, as a supplier, the Finta participated in the conquest of three Brazilian first division titles (Vasco/89, and Corinthians/90 Botafogo/95). Also won the league several times access to the first division of Brazilian football (Juventude champion and vice-campeão/94 Goiás, Botafogo R. Black Vice campeão/98 and Santa Cruz deputy campeão/99, Paraná Clube - Champion JH Cup 2000, Paysandu - champion in 2001, Botafogo Rio - runner-up 2003, Santa Cruz - runner-up 2005). Got two titles Brazilian third division (New Horizontino/94 and Remo/05), two World Cups in Brazil 93/94 Super Cups and two South American 91/93 (Cruzeiro of Belo Horizonte). Paysandu The North won the FIFA World Cup 2002 and Champions in 2002, gaining the right to participate in the Libertadores 2003. There are 42 state championships (Corinthians, Cruzeiro, Sport Recife, Paysandu, Goias, Vasco, MG America, Nautical, Ceará, Vila Nova, Santa Cruz, two tricampeonatos with Vasco and Goiás, two international tournaments (Tereza Herrera/89 with Vasco and Ramon de Carranza/96 with Botafogo in Rio), and five other titles with the men's basketball team from France and women's volleyball Ribeirao Preto (São Paulo / Brazil / South America), totaling 60 titles won by clubs (football, volleyball and basketball) uniform with our brand (42estaduais, 13 national and 5 international).

Finta has over four thousand customers throughout Brazil. Finta's products are exported to Europe, Central America, South America, the Caribbean and Japan.

Sponsorships 
The following list that are sponsored by Finta:

Association football

Associations 
  Ligue Haïtienne

Clubs teams 

  Brusque
  AS de Carrefour
  AS Cavaly
  AS Mirebalais
  Baltimore SC
  Dynamite AC
  US Frères
  Roulado FC
  Tempête FC
  Victory Sportif Club
  Violette AC
  Ange Violet Hiroshima
  Cento Cuore Harima FC
  Renofa Yamaguchi
  Joe Public

Past sponsorships

Association football

National teams 
  Saint Vincent and the Grenadines
  Trinidad and Tobago (2006)

Club teams 

  Araxá (2013–15)
  Confiança
  Botafogo (1989, 1995–97, 2002–04)
  Ceará
  Corinthians (1990–94)
  Cruzeiro (1990–1996, 2015)
  Goiás 
  Juventude (2008)
  Novorizontino
  Paraná (1990–93, 1999–2002)
  Paysandu (2001–05, 2007–08) 
  Ponte Preta (1999–2001)
  Santa Cruz (1998–2007)	
  Vasco da Gama (1988–1994)
  Volta Redonda
  Vila Nova
  América (1997–2001, 2010–11)
  Náutico (1985–1991, 2001–05)
  Sport Recife (1973–74, 1991–94)
  Alajuelense (2001-02)
  Santos
  Thespakusatsu Gunma (2013-19)
  Ansan Greeners (2019–2020)
  Sangju Sangmu

Basketball

Club teams 
  Franca

Volleyball

Club teams 

  Minas Tênis Clube (2008–2013)
  Sada Cruzeiro (2010–13)

References

External links
  

Brazilian brands
Clothing companies established in 1987
Sporting goods manufacturers of Brazil
Clothing companies of Brazil
Sportswear brands
Manufacturing companies based in São Paulo